The 2016 Big League World Series was a youth baseball tournament that took place from July 26-August 2 in Easley, South Carolina, United States. Taoyuan, Taiwan defeated Maui, Hawaii in the championship game. It was the first BLWS title for Taiwan since 1996, and extended their overall record to 18.

On August 26, 2016 Little League announced the elimination of the "Big League" division in baseball, and softball. This made the 49th edition the final BLWS.

Teams

Results

United States Bracket

International Bracket

Consolation round

Elimination Round

References

Big League World Series
Big League World Series
Big League